Rachel Stephens (October 29, 1930 – December 14, 2018) was an American television, stage, and motion picture actress.

Education
Born in Fairfield, Illinois, Stephens had a master's degree from Indiana University Bloomington in theatre arts. Prior to acting in movies she was a CBS research assistant and a television actress.

Theater

Stephens performed on stage as a reporter in The Best Things In Life Are Free and as the sister of Hope Lange in Bus Stop (play) (1955). In 1972 she appeared with Jo Anne Worley at the Arlington Park Theater in Chicago. Stephens played Charlie's former mistress in a rendition of the comedy Goodbye Charlie by George Axelrod.

She was part of a cast which toured with Van Johnson in the comedy Send Me No Flowers, in 1976. In 1980 she was featured in the Neil Simon play The Gingerbread Lady. Stephens starred as Toby, an aging beauty who needs to be constantly reminded that she is attractive.

Movie actress

Stephens was signed to a film contract by Twentieth Century Fox in May 1956. In her first movie she played a nurse in Bigger Than Life (1956). The film was a drama which starred James Mason and Barbara Rush.
Stephens next appeared in Oh, Men! Oh, Women! (1957) directed by Nunnally Johnson and produced by Cheryl Crawford.

In The True Story of Jesse James (1957), she has the part of Anne James.

Stephens has an uncredited part, as Miss Trimmingham, in From the Terrace (1960). Her option was renewed by 20th Century Fox in February 1960. The adaptation of the John O'Hara novel stars Paul Newman and Joanne Woodward. It received a Golden Globe nomination. Her last film appearance came in 1994 in Ri¢hie Ri¢h as Richie's secretary.

Private life

Stephens dated Nico Minardos until they broke up in January 1959. Her eyes were an emerald hue. She was married with Dennis Sook until his death in October 2017, she died a year later in Evanston, Illinois, at age 88.

References
 

Chicago Daily Herald, "Charlie's One Asset Is Worley", September 5, 1972, page 51
Daily Oklahoman, "Van Johnson Opens Comedy", September 14, 1976, page 36
Los Angeles Times, "Return Celebrated By Our Gang Kid", February 23, 1960, page B7
New York Times, "Kings Go Forth Will Be A Movie", May 9, 1956, page 36
New York Times, "Oh Men!, Oh Women!", February 22, 1957, page 25
New York Times, "Screen: Jesse James", March 23, 1957, page 17
Sheboygan Press, "Peninsula Players To Open 38th Season At Fish Creek", June 29, 1972, page 35
Syracuse Herald Journal, "Rachel Stephens Is Keeping Busy", September 24, 1956, page 10
Vidette Messenger, "Behind The Scenes In Hollywood", January 9, 1959, page 4

External links
 

Indiana University alumni
American stage actresses
American film actresses
Western (genre) film actresses
American television actresses
20th-century American actresses
20th Century Studios contract players